Nihalgarh railway station is a railway station in Amethi district, Uttar Pradesh. Its code is NHH. It serves Jagdishpur town. The station consists of two platforms. The main line of the Oudh and Rohilkhand Railway from Lucknow to Rae Bareli and Mughal Sarai serves the south-western portion.

Trains 
Some of the trains that runs from Nihalgarh are :
 Lokmanya Tilak Terminus – Sultanpur Express
 Mahamana Express
 Suhaildev SF Express
 Begampura Express
 Himgiri Superfast Express
 Akal Takht Express
 Indore–Patna Express
 Marudhar Express (via Sultanpur)
 Sadhavana Express
 Ahmedabad–Sultanpur Express
 Varanasi–Sultanpur Passenger
 Howrah–Amritsar Express

See also 

 Varanasi Junction railway station
 Sultanpur Junction railway station
 Varanasi–Sultanpur–Lucknow line

References

External links 

 NHH/Nihalgarh

Railway stations in Amethi district
Lucknow NR railway division